The Godolphin Estate is a National Trust property situated in Godolphin Cross,  north-west of Helston in Cornwall, United Kingdom. The house is a Grade I listed building.

History
The Estate is the former seat of the Dukes of Leeds and the Earls of Godolphin. It contains a Grade I listed Tudor/Stuart mansion, complete with early formal gardens (dating from circa 1500) and Elizabethan stables (circa 1600). The present house is remnant of a larger mansion. From 1786 it was owned by the Dukes of Leeds who never lived there. In 1920 the 10th Duke of Leeds sold it to the sitting tenant Peter Quintrell Treloar. After Treloar died in 1922, the following year his wife sold it to James Penna an agricultural engineer. James Penna died in 1926 and his son James Henry Penna inherited the house and estate and lived there until his death in 1935. In 1935 it was sold to C.B. Stevens, a local man, but he then sold the house and estate to artist Walter Elmer Schofield and family in 1937. Schofield's architect son Sydney restored the mansion, and received it as a wedding present from his parents. In 2000, Mary Schofield, widow of Sydney sold the wider estate to the National Trust, and in 2007 she then sold the house, gardens and farm-yard to the National Trust. 

The National Trust then carried out a major conservation project of the architecture of the North Range (the historic front) to prevent it from further decay and collapse. The house is open to the public on certain days. The Estate measures  and includes Godolphin Hill which provides views over west Cornwall. More than four hundred recorded archaeological features range from Bronze Age enclosures to 19th-century mine buildings. The Trust has been improving public access to the Estate.

The large village of Godolphin Cross (sometimes Crossroads), in the parish of Breage, adjoins the estate to the east. Amenities include a primary school.

House and gardens
The house and gardens were acquired by the National Trust in August 2007. Various events are held throughout the year. The house is approached from the north and consists of three wings around a square courtyard and the front wall of a further building on the south side. The main buildings originally stood to the south of this with two projecting wings. One room of the 16th-century remains in the east range; this has linenfold panelling. Opposite the hall range is the Jacobean range; the north side is castellated and has a loggia of seven bays on the ground floor. Stylistic features here appear to be of the mid 17th-century and suggest that the accepted date for the house of after 1712 is very unlikely. The house is available as a holiday let for approximately three weeks each month when it is not open to the public.

Legend and customs

A custom first recorded in the 18th century, but may relate to the 14th century, was enacted yearly on Candlemas day (2 February) until 1921. Godolphin and St Aubyn wagered their respective seats on a race between two snails; Godolphin, losing, pricked his snail which curled up and lost the race. St Aubyn instead of claiming Godolphin's estate imposed an annual custom. The reeve of Lambourne knocked on the door of the great hall of Godolphin Court and demanded to be let in. He would jump on the table and demand 'rents duties and customs'. These were paid in a large quart of strong beer, a loaf of wheaten bread and cheese of similar value and 2s 8d.

References

External links

 The Godolphin Estate information at the National Trust
 Local News - Mary Schofield - Previous Owner of Godolphin House

Country houses in Cornwall
Grade I listed buildings in Cornwall
National Trust properties in Cornwall
Historic house museums in Cornwall
Gardens in Cornwall
Grade II* listed parks and gardens in Cornwall
Grade I listed houses